The Unknown is a 1927 American silent horror film directed by Tod Browning, and starring Lon Chaney as carnival knife thrower "Alonzo the Armless" and Joan Crawford as his beloved carnival girl Nanon. Originally titled Alonzo the Armless, filming took place from February 7 to March 18, 1927 on a $217,000 budget.

The film carried the tagline: "A superb mystery thriller, unusual and startling even for a Chaney film. Lon as "The Unknown" eats, drinks, shoots a rifle and dresses with his feet. Don't miss this startling spectacle!" 
Stills exist showing Chaney made up as Alonzo the Armless.

Plot

"Alonzo the Armless" is a circus freak who uses his feet to toss knives and fire a rifle at his partner, Nanon.  However, he is an impostor and a fugitive from the law. He actually has arms, but keeps them tightly strapped to his torso, a secret known only to his midget friend Cojo. Alonzo's left hand has a double thumb, which would readily identify him as the perpetrator of various crimes from his past.

Alonzo is secretly in love with Nanon.  Malabar, the circus strongman, is devoted to her as well, but she has a strong fear of men's arms and cannot stand being pawed by them, so she shuns him. She only feels comfortable around the armless Alonzo, because she doesn't feel threatened by him. When she embraces and kisses him one day, he is given hope, but Cojo warns him that he cannot let it happen again. If she holds him too tightly, she might feel his arms.

When Antonio Zanzi, the circus's owner and Nanon's father, discovers Alonzo's secret, Alonzo strangles him with his bare hands outside of his circus wagon. Nanon witnesses this through a window, but her view is partially blocked. A flash of lightning reveals that her father's killer has a double thumb on his left hand, but she cannot see the killer's face. Since Alonzo is believed to be armless, he is not a suspect.

When the circus leaves town, Alonzo has Nanon remain behind with him. He takes extreme measures to try to win the woman he loves. He blackmails a surgeon into amputating his arms.  While he is away, however, Malabar's persistent love finally enables Nanon to overcome her phobia of arms, and she agrees to marry him.

When Alonzo (now truly armless) returns to Nanon, she excitedly tells him that she and Malabar are getting married.  Alonzo is shocked and horrified, first laughing hysterically, then crying, as he realizes he has cut off his arms for nothing. His emotional outburst confuses the couple, but then Nanon tells Malabar "Look! Alonzo is crying because he is so happy for us."

Alonzo then learns that Malabar and Nanon have been practicing a new act, where the strongman's arms are seemingly pulled in opposite directions by two wild horses (who are actually running on hidden treadmills).  During the first performance, Alonzo stops one treadmill in an attempt to maim or kill Malabar, hoping the horses will tear the strongman's arms from his body.  When Nanon starts to intervene, Alonzo threatens her with a knife, telling her to stay back. However, she rushes to calm down one of the horses. Alonzo tries to save her from injury by pushing her out of the way. The horse knocks Alonzo down and fatally stomps him to death. The machine is turned off and Malabar is saved from mutilation.

Cast
 Lon Chaney as Alonzo the Armless
 Norman Kerry as Malabar the Mighty
 Joan Crawford as Nanon Zanzi (Estrellita in the original script)
 Nick De Ruiz as Antonio Zanzi (Nanon's father)
 John George as Cojo the dwarf
 Frank Lanning as Costra
 Polly Moran as Landlady (scenes deleted)
 Bobbie Mack as Gypsy (scenes deleted)
 Louise Emmons as Gypsy Woman (uncredited)
 Julian Rivero as Man in Audience (uncredited)
 Billy Seay as The Little Wolf (uncredited)
 John St. Polis (John Sainpolis) as Surgeon (uncredited)
 Italia and Venetia Frandi as undetermined
 Tom Amandares as Gypsy
 Paul Desmuke as Alonzo Body Double (uncredited)

Production

Browning’s genesis for the story emerged from his reflection upon an individual who suffers a multiple amputation of limbs and its dramatic personal repercussions. Browning describes this process beginning with the spectacle of traumatic disfigurement, rather than plot:

Actor and collaborator Chaney developed his characterization of Alonzo on the same premise: “I contrived to make myself look like an armless man, not simply to shock and horrify you but merely to bring to the screen a dramatic story of an armless man.”

Metro-Goldwyn-Mayer originally sought to pair new Swedish property Greta Garbo with Chaney “the man of a thousand faces” who was emerging as the studio’s top box office draw in 1927, but the female lead went to the eighteen-year-old Joan Crawford, another M-G-M starlet 

Chaney did collaborative scenes with real-life armless double Paul Desmuke (sometimes credited as Peter Dismuki), whose legs and feet were used to manipulate objects such as knives and cigarettes in frame with Chaney's upper body and face.

In the original screenplay, Alonzo murders both the doctor and Cojo to eliminate them as witnesses before he returns to claim Nanon, but these scenes never made it to the final print.

Critical appraisal
The Unknown is widely regarded as the most outstanding of the Browning-Chaney collaborations and a masterpiece of the late silent film era. Critic Scott Brogan regards The Unknown worthy of “cult status.” 

It is considered the most unique and disturbing of the eight collaborations between Browning and Chaney at Metro-Goldwyn-Mayer. Chaney’s rendering of character Alfonzo and the horrific self-mutilation he endures to win the love of Nanon is reminiscent of the theatre of the Grand Guignol.

Film historian Ken Hanke considers the film to be in many respects the best of Browning's films with Lon Chaney. Burt Lancaster said that Chaney's portrayal in The Unknown featured “one of the most compelling and emotionally exhausting scenes I have ever seen an actor do.” (referring to the scene where Chaney realizes he has cut off his arms in vain.)

It is listed in the film reference book 1001 Movies You Must See Before You Die, which stated, "Drawing a remarkable and haunting performance from Chaney and filling the plot with twists and unforgettable characters, Browning here creates a chilling masterpiece of psychological (and psychosexual) drama."

"There is no gainsaying the fact that this story is exceptionally tense melodrama that grips the interest and fascinates the spectator, but it is decidedly gruesome. Chaney's large following, however, has been educated to expect him in such roles, and certainly he has never given a finer performance. The manner in which he is shown using his feet as normal persons do their hands is remarkably well done and his facial expressions are wonderful--he uses no eccentric make-up in this role." ---Moving Picture World

"Although it has strength and undoubtedly sustains the interest, THE UNKNOWN...is anything but a pleasant story. It is gruesome and at times shocking, and the principal character deteriorates from a more or less sympathetic individual to an arch-fiend...Mr. Chaney really gives a marvelous idea of the Armless Wonder, for to act in this film he has learned to use his feet as hands when eating, drinking and smoking. He even scratches his head with his toe when meditating." ---The New York Times

"A good Chaney film that might have been great. Chaney and his characterizations invite stories that have power behind them. Every time Browning thinks of Chaney he probably looks around for a typewriter and says 'let's get gruesome.'" ---Variety

"(The Chaney) picture fascinates us, but then they make it so short that it left us bewildered and unsatisfied. But there is nothing that one can say of Mr. Chaney. His performances are always perfect." ---New York herald Tribune

"Like other Chaney pictures directed by Tod Browning, this has a macabre atmosphere. If you wince at a touch or two of horror, don't go to The Unknown....It has a finely sinister plot, some moments with a real shock and Lon Chaney." ---Photoplay

"A gruesome and unpleasant picture....it is artistically acted and skillfully directed. But those facts do not atone for the offence given by the feature to every normal-minded movie-goer. Of Mr. Chaney's acting, it is enough to say it is excellent of its kind. Similar praise might be given the work of a skilled surgeon engaged in ripping open the abdomen of a patient. But who wants to see it??" ---Harrison's Reports

Themes 

 
Based on a story by director Tod Browning and a scenario by Waldemar Young, this tale of sexual obsession involving physical and emotional disfigurement unfolds in a circus setting—a setting that comports with Browning’s penchant for “the lower forms of spectacle and theatrical performance.”

Illusion and deception: Browning, demonstrating his delight in “demystifying the spectacles of show culture” opens The Unknown with the exposure of a simple carnival illusion: The Gypsy knife-thrower “Alonzo the Armless” masquerades as a double amputee who expertly hurls his projectiles with his feet.  Browning quickly disabuses moviegoers of his deformity, as Alonzo, a fully intact man, uses a corset to bind his arms during performances to appear as a freak.  Alonzo’s faux disability has a more sinister and practical purpose: as a criminal on the run from the law, his “armless” condition places him above suspicion by authorities.

Alonzo’s only genuine abnormality is a congenital bifid thumb on his right hand.  This minor deformity is a key element that leads Alonzo to submit to a surgical enormity.

Sexual Frustration and Self-mutilation:  The object of Alonzo’s tender and secret affection—Nanon (Joan Crawford) his dare-devil partner— harbors a neurotic phobia, an obsessive, hysterical revulsion to the embrace of a man’s arms. Her dysfunction (perhaps instilled by her pathological father, ringmaster Zanzi (Nick De Ruiz)) undermines any sexual intimacy with the highly virile Alonzo, his sexual prowess symbolized by his knife-throwing expertise and his double thumb. A violent dispute with Zanzi leads Alonzo to strangle him to death. The only witness to the murder is Nanon, who discerns only a single feature of the assailant: a double thumb.

The logic of Alonzo’s dilemma serves as the rationale for Browning’s and Chaney’s most outrageous literary conceit: Alonzo, in order to make himself appealing to Nanon and eliminate the tell-tale bifid thumb, has both is arms amputated by a back alley surgeon, an act of symbolic self-castration, satisfying Nanon’s need for a “sexless” man.

Animal Attributes in Humans: Browning’s male protagonist frequently exhibits the instinctual and impulsive behavior of animals, arising from a physical abnormality.  Examples include “Dead Legs” in West of Zanzibar (1928), who communes with a chimpanzee, “Tiger Haynes” a wildlife trapper in Where East is East (1929) and Dan “The Black Bird” Tate in The Black Bird (1926). Biographer Stuart Rosenthal points out this theme in The Unknown: 

Lon Chaney’s simian-like use of his feet is directly linked to his physical deformity, anticipating the primal ferocity of his reaction to Nanon’s betrayal in marrying circus strongman Malaber (Norman Kerry).

Restoration
For many years the film was considered lost, until a 35 mm print was located at the Cinémathèque Française in 1968. In 1973, at a lecture given at George Eastman House, Cinémathèque Française director Henri Langlois said the delay in finding the print of The Unknown was because they had hundreds of film cans marked l'inconnu (French for "Unknown") in their collection. Several early scenes may be missing, but if so, they do not affect the story continuity. The rediscovered film ran 49 minutes. In 2022, a new restoration by George Eastman House premiered at the Pordenone Silent Film Festival; the running time was 60 minutes. The existing shortened version was augmented with footage from a newly-discovered Czech nitrate print which contained all the scenes missing from the other print. Restored shots/scenes include: the original opening scene of a boy watching the circus tent from a church tower and his father or grandfather giving him a coin so he can pay his way into the circus; audience reactions during Alonzo’s show; the fight between Alonzo and Costra after the show; and a scene of an old fortune-teller warning Nanon that something terrible is going to happen.

Soundtrack 
In 1994, the Welsh composer and recording artist John Cale wrote a score to accompany the film, and performed it himself live for a screening at the Pordenone Silent Film Festival. A later performance was later released as an album.

Footnotes

References
Brenez, Nicole. 2006. Body Dreams: Lon Chaney and Tod Browning- Thesaurus Anatomicus  in The Films of Tod Browning, Bernd Herzogenrath, editor. Black Dog Publishing, London.  pp. 95–113.
Brogan, Scott. 2008. The Unknown. https://silentfilm.org/the-unknown/ Retrieved 20 March 2021.
Conterio, Martyn. 2018. Where to begin with Tod Browning.  https://www2.bfi.org.uk/news-opinion/news-bfi/features/where-begin-tod-browning Retrieved 15 January 2021. 
Diedmann, Stefanie and Knörer, Ekkehard. 2006. The Spectator’s Spectacle: Tod Browning’s Theatre in The Films of Tod Browning, Bernd Herzogenrath, editor. Black Dog Publishing. London.  pp. 69–77
Eaker, Alfred. 2016. Tod Browning Retrospective https://alfredeaker.com/2016/01/26/todd-browning-director-retrospective/ Retrieved 26 February 2021.
Herzogenrath, Bernd. 2006. The Films of Tod Browning. Black Dog Publishing. London. 
Sobchack, Vivian. 2006. The Films of Tod Browning: An Overview Long Past in The Films of Tod Browning in The Films of Tod Browning, editor Bernd Herzogenrath, 2006 Black Dog Publishing. London. pp. 21–39. 
Rosenthal, Stuart.  1975. Tod Browning: The Hollywood Professionals, Volume 4. The Tantivy Press. 
Stafford, Jeff. 2003. The Unknown. Turner Classic Movies. https://www.tcm.com/tcmdb/title/2297/the-unknown#articles-reviews?articleId=516 Retrieved 20 March 2021.

External links

 
 
 
 
 The Unknown at Rotten Tomatoes
 Article on "The Unknown", author Bret Wood, Filmfax Magazine, Feb./Mar. 1992 issue

1927 horror films
1927 films
American silent feature films
American horror films
American black-and-white films
Circus films
Films directed by Tod Browning
Metro-Goldwyn-Mayer films
Films set in Madrid
Fictional Romani people
Films about disability
Rediscovered American films
1920s rediscovered films
Films about amputees
1920s English-language films
Films about sideshow performers
Silent horror films
1920s American films